Sarulia  is a village in the Beldanga I CD block in the Berhampore subdivision of Murshidabad district in the state of West Bengal, India.

Geography

Location

Area overview
The area shown in the map alongside, covering Berhampore and Kandi subdivisions, is spread across both the natural physiographic regions of the district, Rarh and Bagri. The headquarters of Murshidabad district, Berhampore, is in this area. The entire area is overwhelmingly rural with over 80% of the population living in the rural areas.

Note: The map alongside presents some of the notable locations in the subdivisions. All places marked in the map are linked in the larger full screen map.

Demographics
According to the 2011 Census of India, Sarulia had a total population of 9,417, of which 4,780 (51%) were males and 4,637 (49%) were females. Population in the age range 0–6 years was 1,593. The total number of literate persons in Sarulia was 5,033 (64.33% of the population over 6 years).

Civic administration

CD block HQ
The headquarters of Beldanga I CD block are located at Sarulia.

Transport
National Highway 12 (old number NH 34) passes through this block.

Beldanga railway station on the  Ranaghat-Lalgola branch line is about 2 km from Sarulia. It was opened in 1905.

References

Villages in Murshidabad district